Gerard II may refer to:

 Gerard II, Count of Guelders (from 1129 to 1131) 
 Gerard II of Isenburg-Kempenich (co-Lord in 1329–1330)

See also
Girard II of Roussillon